Johanna Konta defeated Zhang Shuai in the final, 6–2, 6–1, to win the women's singles tennis title at the 2021 Nottingham Open. The win earned Konta her fourth career singles title, her first since 2017, and made her the first British player to win a WTA Tour singles title on home soil since Sue Barker in 1981. This would also be Konta's final title before she announced her retirement in December 2021 due to a long-term knee injury.

Caroline Garcia was the defending champion from when the event was last held in 2019, but she did not return to compete.

This tournament also marked the WTA Tour main draw debut of British player and future US Open champion Emma Raducanu.

Seeds
All seeds received byes into the second round.

Draw

Finals

Top half

Section 1

Section 2

Bottom half

Section 3

Section 4

Qualifying

Seeds

Qualifiers

Lucky losers

Draw

First qualifier

Second qualifier

Third qualifier

Fourth qualifier

Fifth qualifier

Sixth qualifier

Seventh qualifier

Eighth qualifier

References

External Links 
 Main Draw
 Qualifying Draw

Nottingham Open - Singles
2021 Women's Singles
2021 Nottingham Open
2021 in British sport